Dietmar Hötger (born 8 June 1947 in Hoyerswerda) is a German judo athlete, who competed for the SC Dynamo Berlin / Sportvereinigung (SV) Dynamo. He won medals at international competitions.

References

External links
 

German male judoka
1947 births
Living people
Olympic medalists in judo
Medalists at the 1972 Summer Olympics
Olympic bronze medalists for East Germany
Olympic judoka of East Germany
Judoka at the 1972 Summer Olympics
Judoka at the 1976 Summer Olympics
People from Hoyerswerda
Sportspeople from Saxony
20th-century German people